Black September was the conflict fought in Jordan between the JAF and the PLO primarily in September 1970.

Black September may also refer to:
 Black September (comics), a reboot of Malibu Comics' Ultraverse
 Black September Organization, a Palestinian terrorist organization